Šárka Vondrková (born 19 October 1976) is a Czech former ice dancer. With Lukáš Král, she is the 1997 Czech national champion. They placed ninth at the 1995 World Junior Championships in Budapest, 15th at the 1996 European Championships in Sofia, and 22nd at the 1996 World Championships in Edmonton.

Programs 
(with Král)

Results 
GP: Champions Series (Grand Prix)

with Král

References 

1976 births
Czech female ice dancers
Living people
People from Český Těšín